The 2015 WNBA draft was the league's draft for the 2015 WNBA season. The Seattle Storm picked first.

This year's draft was unusual in that two players with remaining college eligibility declared for the draft—Jewell Loyd of Notre Dame, who had one year of eligibility remaining, and Amanda Zahui B. of Minnesota, with two years remaining. Both players were draft-eligible by virtue of their births in 1993; under current draft rules, players who turn 22 in the calendar year of the draft can declare themselves eligible even if they have not completed college eligibility. Before this season, only two players with remaining college eligibility had ever entered the WNBA draft, and only one of these did so before her fourth college season (Kelsey Bone in 2012).

Draft lottery
The lottery selection to determine the order of the top four picks in the 2015 draft occurred on August 21, 2014. The team that would get the first pick would be the winner of the lottery.

Below were the chances for each team to get specific picks in the 2015 draft lottery, rounded to three decimal places:

Invited players
The WNBA announced on April 13, 2015 that 12 players had been invited to attend the draft. Unless indicated otherwise, all players listed are Americans who played at U.S. colleges.
 Brittany Boyd, California
 Reshanda Gray, California
 Dearica Hamby, Wake Forest
 Isabelle Harrison, Tennessee
 Brittany Hrynko, DePaul
 Samantha Logic, Iowa
 Jewell Loyd, Notre Dame
 Kaleena Mosqueda-Lewis, Connecticut
 Kiah Stokes, Connecticut
 Aleighsa Welch, South Carolina
 Elizabeth Williams, Duke
  Amanda Zahui B., Minnesota

Key

Draft selections

Round 1

Round 2

Round 3

References

Women's National Basketball Association Draft
Draft
WNBA Draft